The Convergence Movement, also known as the Ancient-Future Faith movement, is a Protestant Christian movement that began during the Fourth Great Awakening (1960–1980) in the United States.

Largely a result of the ecumenical movement and its foundation primarily attributed to Robert E. Webber, the Convergence Movement developed as an effort among evangelical, Pentecostal and charismatic, and liturgical Christians of varying denominational backgrounds to blend charismatic worship with liturgies from the Anglican Book of Common Prayer; they also made use of other liturgical sources common to Lutheranism, Eastern Orthodoxy, and Roman Catholicism. Christian denominations stemming from the Convergence Movement typically identify as Convergence, Ancient-Future Faith, Ancient Faith, Ancient Church, Ancient-Future Church, paleo-orthodox, Pentecostal Catholic or Orthodox, or evangelical Episcopal. Denominations in this movement have also been referred as some form of broader, or new Anglicanism or Episcopalianism.

The pioneers of the Convergence Movement were seeking to restore a primitive form of Christianity different from what the Restoration Movement taught. It was inspired by the spiritual pilgrimages of modern Protestant writers like Thomas Howard, Robert E. Webber, Peter E. Gillquist, and ancient Christian writers such as the Church Fathers and their communities. These men, along with theologians, scripture scholars, and pastors in a number of Protestant denominational traditions, were calling Christians back to what they saw as their roots in the early Church prior to the Great Schism and rise of the state church of the Roman Empire.

History

Background and establishment

Peter Guillquist and the Evangelical Orthodox Church 
In 1973, Campus Crusade for Christ missionary Peter E. Gillquist (1938–2012) of Chicago established a network of house churches throughout the United States of America, aiming to restore a primitive form of Christianity, which was called the New Covenant Apostolic Order. Researching the historical basis of the Christian faith, Gillquist and his colleagues found sources for this restoration in the writings of the early Church Fathers. This led the group to practice a more liturgical form of worship than in their previous evangelical background.

In 1979, the Evangelical Orthodox Church was organized. The belief of needing apostolic succession led most members of Evangelical Orthodoxy to join the Antiochian Orthodox Christian Archdiocese of North America in 1987. Others later joined the Orthodox Church in America or Russian Orthodox Church Outside Russia. Today, the Evangelical Orthodox Church—remaining relatively small—has been categorized as Eastern Protestant.

The Chicago Call and Three Streams, One River 
In 1977, "The Chicago Call" was issued by the National Conference of Evangelicals for Historic Christianity, meeting in Warrenville, Illinois. Led by Robert E. Webber (Assoc. Professor of Theology at Wheaton College), along with Peter Gillquist, Thomas Howard, Richard Holt, Donald Bloesch, Jan Dennis, Lane Dennis, and Victor Oliver, the conference discussed the need for evangelical Protestants to rediscover and re-attach to the Christian Church's historic roots. The conference issued several documents which together are known as "The Chicago Call". Components of the document include: "A Call to Historic Roots and Continuity; A Call to Biblical Fidelity; A Call to Creedal Identity; A Call to Holistic Salvation; A Call to Sacramental Integrity; A Call to Spirituality; A Call to Church Authority; and A Call to Church Unity".

In 1984 Charisma magazine, one of the most influential magazines of the Charismatic Movement, published an article by Richard Lovelace entitled "The Three Streams, One River?" (Sept 1984). Lovelace approvingly noted the trend of Catholics, Evangelicals, and Charismatic and Pentecostal Christians moving closer together.

Robert Webber's 1985 book Evangelicals on the Canterbury Trail: Why Evangelicals are Attracted to the Liturgical Church documents the stories of six evangelical Protestants who, for various reasons, had transitioned to the Protestant Episcopal Church in the United States. Publication of this book stirred up a great deal of interest in the evangelical Protestant press, generating numerous reviews in Christianity Today and other widely read evangelical publications. In the following years, Webber wrote several additional books that had great influence on evangelical churches seeking to incorporate liturgy and traditional practices into their worship, and numbers of evangelical Protestants and Charismatics continued to migrate to the historic liturgical denominations.

Ecumenism and controversy

Transitions to Roman Catholicism and the ACNA 
In 2007, former Archbishop Randolph Sly of the Charismatic Episcopal Church—formed in 1992—joined the Roman Catholic Church and was ordained into the Personal Ordinariate of the Chair of St. Peter, broadening recognition of the Convergence Movement among the ancient liturgical Christian denominations. In 2011, Bishop Derek Jones of the Communion of Evangelical Episcopal Churches—founded in 1995—was received by the Convocations of Anglicans in North America into the Anglican Church in North America.

From 2008 to 2014, the Communion of Evangelical Episcopal Churches held informal ecumenical dialogue with the Roman Catholic Church through Bishop Tony Palmer until his death, befriending Pope Francis.

Transitions from the Anglican realignment 
Among the Anglican realignment, at least one clergyman became a bishop within the Convergence Movement. In the Anglican Church in North America in 2019, the suspended priest Jack Lumanog was excommunicated upon their election to the episcopacy within the Apostolic Communion of Anglican Churches, a Convergence and self-identified Continuing Anglican jurisdiction established in 2005 originally as the Abyssinian Apostolic Church by Archbishop Darel Chase (who also consecrated a claimant to the Roman papacy, and established the National Bible College Association accreditation mill which subsequently accredited their self-established Metropolitan Christian University and Midwestern School of Divinity).

Following Lumanog's consecration and the start of their diocese in this Convergence denomination, he appointed Gideon Arinzechukwu (a deposed Episcopalian priest) as interim archdeacon for their diocese in the Apostolic Communion of Anglican Churches in 2020. In December 2022, his church—Messiah Anglican Church—affiliated with Lumanog's diocese were publicly disowned by the Church of Nigeria in the Anglican Communion to prevent alleged misrepresentation.

In 2022, Archbishop Sterling Lands II of the Evangelical Episcopal Communion (once part of the Communion of Evangelical Episcopal Churches), and Archbishop Deng Dau Deng, a former archbishop-elect of the Anglican Church of South Sudan, joined The African Episcopal Church, a province of the Apostolic Communion of Anglican Churches.

Convergence Christianity and Eastern Orthodoxy 
In 2020, the Convergence Movement was highlighted by Religion News Service after a trend of young Christians returning to traditional churches such as the Union of Charismatic Orthodox Churches; leadership of the Union of Charismatic Orthodox Churches met with Archbishop Elpidophoros of the Greek Orthodox Archdiocese of America (Ecumenical Patriarchate) at the end of 2020. By 2022, the founding bishop of the Union of Charismatic Orthodox Churches—Dr. Emilio Alvarez—was highlighted in the journal, Liturgy for their publication of Pentecostal Orthodoxy: Toward an Ecumenism of the Spirit.

Holy orders 

Since the advent of Convergence Christianity, numerous denominations and organizations have sought or claimed apostolic succession through excommunicated Roman Catholic bishops and wandering bishops of Anglican and Orthodox traditions including Carlos Duarte Costa, Arnold Mathew, Joseph Vilatte, Aftimios Ofiesh, and others in order to preserve doctrinal and apostolic continuity and establish sacramental legitimacy.

While excommunicated and characterized as wandering bishops from the churches they were ordained, Christians in this movement justify continued validity in those bishops through the concept of "valid but illicit" ordinations and continued practice of the faith as their predecessors. According to the Code of Canon Law within the Roman Catholic Church, all Catholic bishops are able to ordain in holy orders, yet ordinations without authorization are deemed illicit and result in automatic excommunication (and for some, laicization, i.e., Emmanuel Milingo).

The additional Anglican argument of "once a bishop, always a bishop" gains prominence among those in the Convergence Movement; there is also an understanding through Roman Catholic teaching on sacramental character. Roman Catholic dogma suggests those excommunicated for valid but illicit ordinations—even those deposed and laicized—cannot have their orders vacated or revoked though their use of the sacraments go unrecognized among those in communion with the Pope of Rome, as they have only been relieved of episcopal duties within the Roman Catholic Church and its Eastern Catholic Churches specifically. In Roman Catholicism, the Catechism of the Catholic Church (1992), §1121 expresses:

From mainstream Eastern Orthodox teaching, no holy orders outside of their churches are recognized.

Churches
The following is not a complete list, but aims to provide a comprehensible overview of the diversity among denominations of Convergence Christianity. Only organizations with Wikipedia articles will be listed.

 Apostolic Pastoral Congress
 Charismatic Episcopal Church
 Communion of Evangelical Episcopal Churches
 Holy Communion of Churches
 Union of Charismatic Orthodox Churches

See also

 Paleo-orthodoxy
 Anglican realignment
 Ecumenism
 Evangelical Catholic
 Hebrew Roots
 Independent sacramental movement
 Open evangelicalism

References

Further reading
 Gillquist, Rev. Peter E. Becoming Orthodox: A Journey to the Ancient Christian Faith. Ben Lomond, CA: Conciliar Press, 1989.
 "Sound of Rushing Waters", by Daniel W. Williams, ACW Press/DQuest Publications, 2005. 
 "Forgotten Power", William L. DeArteaga, 2002 Zondervan Publishing, Grand Rapids Michigan, 49530, 
 "Evangelical, Sacramental, and Pentecostal: Why the Church Should Be All Three", Gordon T. Smith, 2017 IVP Academic,

External links
 Documents from The Chicago Call
 The Convergence Movement, article written in 1992 by Wayne Boosahda and Randy Sly for the Complete Library of Christian Worship, Robert Webber, ed.
 Convergence Movement, Association of Religion Data Archives
 Website of the Apostolic Pastoral Congress
 Website of the Charismatic Episcopal Church
 Website of the Communion of Evangelical Episcopal Churches
 Website of the Holy Communion of Churches 

 
Anglican liturgy
Christian movements
Christian revivals
History of Protestantism